NGC 362 (also known as Caldwell 104) is a globular cluster located in the constellation Tucana in the Southern Hemisphere, slightly north of the Small Magellanic Cloud, to which it is completely unrelated. It was discovered on August 1, 1826 by James Dunlop. It is visible to the naked eye in dark skies, and is an impressive sight in a telescope, although it is somewhat overshadowed by its larger and brighter neighbour 47 Tucanae.

The stars of NGC 362 have an average metallicity higher than the stars in most globulars. This implies that NGC 362 is a relatively young globular cluster. It also has an overabundance of binary stars, and an exceptionally tight core 13 light-years in diameter. The orbit of NGC 362 is highly eccentric, taking it to within 3,260 light-years of the Galactic Center.

See also
 List of globular clusters

References

External links
 
 
 

104b
18260801
Globular clusters
0362
Tucana (constellation)
Discoveries by James Dunlop